Mexiscope was a cinematic process used in various Mexican film productions, specifically by Producciones Rosas Priego and Rosas Films, intended to widen the screen format. This process' color was provided by Eastmancolor.

Films using Mexiscope
Pulgarcito (1957), with Cesáreo Quezadas
La guarida del buitre (1958), with Antonio Aguilar
Los muertos no hablan (1958), with Antonio Aguilar and Flor Silvestre
Tan bueno el giro como el colorado (1959), with Luis Aguilar, Demetrio González, Flor Silvestre, and Rosa de Castilla
Yo... el aventurero (1959), with Antonio Aguilar and Rosa de Castilla
Santa Claus (1959), with José Elías Moreno and Cesáreo Quezadas
Sol en llamas (1962), with Antonio Aguilar and Maricruz Olivier

Motion picture film formats